Johann Lothar Freiherr von Faber (born 12 June 1817 in Unterspitzgarten near Stein, Bavaria – 26 July 1896 in Stein) was a German industrialist. He inherited the pencil company Faber-Castell (then called A.W. Faber) in 1839 after the death of his father, Georg Leonhard von Faber. Under his leadership, the company gained access to new sources of raw materials and expanded internationally. Von Faber also played an important role in the introduction of trademark protection in Germany; his 1874 petition to the German Reichstag for such legislation contributed to the Act on Trade Mark Protection, passed the following year.

Lothar von Faber married Ottilie Richter in 1847. The couple had one child, Wilhelm, born in 1851.

Bibliography

References

External links 
Homepage des Unternehmens Faber-Castell
Homepage der Lothar-von-Faber-Schule (Staatliche Fachoberschule Nürnberg)
 Eintrag zu A.W. Faber-Castell auf Georg Büttner’s Bleistiftseiten

Members of the Bavarian Reichsrat
1817 births
1896 deaths
People from Fürth (district)
German industrialists